Paratropis is a genus of spiders in the family Paratropididae.

Species
, it contains 10 species
 Paratropis elicioi Dupérré, 2015 — Ecuador
 Paratropis florezi Perafán, Galvis & Pérez-Miles, 2019 — Colombia
 Paratropis minuscula (Almeida & de Morais, 2022) — Guyana
 Paratropis otonga Dupérré & Tapia, 2020 — Ecuador
 Paratropis papilligera F. O. Pickard-Cambridge, 1896 — Colombia, Brazil
 Paratropis pristirana Dupérré & Tapia, 2020 — Ecuador
 Paratropis sanguinea Mello-Leitão, 1923 — Brazil
 Paratropis scruposa Simon, 1889 (type) — Peru
 Paratropis seminermis Caporiacco, 1955 — Venezuela
 Paratropis tuxtlensis Valdez-Mondragón, Mendoza & Francke, 2014 — Mexico

References

External links

 

Paratropididae
Mygalomorphae genera
Spiders of Mexico
Spiders of South America